Randall Joesph LaJoie (born August 28, 1961) is a former NASCAR Busch Series race car driver (now the Xfinity Series), where he won the championship in 1996 and 1997. He is the father of racers Casey and Corey LaJoie.

Early racing career
LaJoie started racing go-karts when he was 11.5 years old. In 1980 he began racing in full-bodied racecars. He was the 1981 track champion in the sportsman division at the Danbury Fair Racearena. When Danbury closed that off-season, he moved to the Waterford Speedbowl where he won modified rookie of the year honors in 1982.

In 1983 he moved to the NASCAR North Tour, and he was the series' rookie of the year. That season, he made his first attempt at making the Daytona 500, but did not qualify. One year later, he suffered a horrific crash in the Gatorade Twin 125's race and failed to qualify once again, he won the consolation race the following year. In 1985 he scored five victories in the North Tour on his way to the series championship; LaJoie was not awarded the championship until 1988, as a lawsuit regarding a disqualification at Catamount Speedway was not resolved until then.

Early NASCAR career

LaJoie made his NASCAR Winston Cup debut in 1985 at Atlanta Motor Speedway. Driving the No. 07 Snellman Construction-sponsored Chevrolet owned by Bob Johnson, he started 16th and finished 14th. He ran his next race the following season at Pocono Raceway,  where he finished 29th after suffering engine failure. He also made his Busch Series debut that season, running four races in his own No. 03 Pontiac, posting a tenth-place finish at Charlotte Motor Speedway. He ran another race in 1987 at Dover International Speedway and finished 10th. After a third-place finish the following season, he joined Frank Cicci Racing mid-way through 1989 and had a career-best second-place run at Hickory Motor Speedway. He ended the season 26th in points.

He did not return to Cicci in 1990, and ran a handful of Busch Races in his own No. 71, his best finish was 23rd at Richmond. He did not run another NASCAR-sanctioned race until 1993, when he got selected to run the No. 20 Fina car owned by Dick Moroso at Talladega. This would turn out to be a shrewd career move for LaJoie as he ran up front with the leaders all afternoon and finished a surprising second. This got LaJoie five more races for Moroso and one for BACE Motorsports in the Busch Series. His best finish was second, twice. In 1994, he was a thought by some to be a dark horse for the championship. He drove for Moroso full-time in the No. 20 Fina Lube-sponsored Chevy that season posting seven Top 10’s. LaJoie led the point standings early in the season before a string of poor results, also a lack of performance dropped him to 16th in the final point standings. He also ran three Cup races, finishing in the Top 20 in all three of them that season.

1995–2002
In 1995, LaJoie was called up to the Cup series again, driving the No. 22 MBNA-sponsored Pontiac Grand Prix for Bill Davis Racing. LaJoie ran 13 races for Davis in his rookie season before he was released midway through the year. Following his departure, he returned to Busch to drive the No. 64 for Dennis Shoemaker. He had three top-tens and a pole at Richmond in nine starts. The following season, he was hired by BACE Motorsports to drive its No. 74 entry. LaJoie won five races over the course of the season and clinched his first Busch Series championship. He followed that up with another five wins and his second straight championship in 1997. After falling back to fourth in the standings in 1998, as well as dealing with a feud with team owner Bill Baumgardner, LaJoie left BACE at the end of the season. He returned to the Cup series that season driving nine races for Hendrick Motorsports.

He signed to drive the No. 1 Chevrolet Monte Carlo for James Finch in 1999, despite the fact that the team lacked major sponsorship. After a season-opening victory at the NAPA Auto Parts 300, Bob Evans Restaurants came on board as the team's sponsor. Despite the added funding, LaJoie dropped to tenth in points. He moved up to seventh in the standings the next season with one win, but chose to depart the team at the end of the season for NEMCO Motorsports. Driving the No. 7 with a sponsorship from Kleenex, LaJoie won two more races but again fell to 12th in points. He had 14 Top 10 finishes in 2002 and moved up one spot in the points.

Recent years
LaJoie returned to the No. 7 team in 2003, and won two poles, but was dismissed from the ride midway through the season. He filled out the year with one race apiece for Innovative Motorsports and FitzBradshaw Racing, as well as a Craftsman Truck race for Kevin Harvick Incorporated. He began the 2004 season in FitzBradshaw's No. 82 car and ran five races with a best finish of 13th, before moving on, running one race each for Marsh Racing and Tommy Baldwin Racing. He also teamed with HT Motorsports in the Craftsman Truck Series for six races, finishing eighth at Gateway. In the Cup series, he had a 43rd-place finish for Hover Motorsports at Richmond, and also ran two races in the No. 98 Ford Taurus for Mach 1 Racing, his best finish being 36th.

Mach 1 switched to the No. 34 Chevy in 2005, and he began the season with them before he was released. He reunited with Cicci in the Busch Series with Dollar General sponsorship and posted three top-10 finishes, finishing 19th in points. Dollar General left the team at season's end, leaving LaJoie without a full-time ride. He had signed to drive for Mach 1, which was under new management again in 2005, but was replaced early in the season by teammate Chad Chaffin. He drove one race apiece in the Busch Series for Davis Motorsports, Jay Robinson Racing, and Vision Racing. He also was a test driver for Richard Childress Racing, filling in for Kevin Harvick in the No. 21 United States Coast Guard Chevy during practice and qualifying sessions.

LaJoie has not run a NASCAR-sanctioned race since 2006, focusing on team ownership for his son Corey, who finished second in the 2012 K&N Pro Series East championship to Kyle Larson despite five wins in the series.

In 2016, LaJoie was inducted into the New England Auto Racers Hall of Fame.

Television work and suspension
In addition to his racing seat business, LaJoie was also a part-time co-host of The Driver's Seat with John Kernan on Sirius Satellite Radio's NASCAR channel 128. He also did television commentary for the ORP and Montreal Busch Series races.

On June 22, 2010, LaJoie was suspended indefinitely from NASCAR for violating their substance abuse policy while working as a crewman on the No. 18 Nationwide Series car.  He had smoked marijuana with some race fans following the Coca-Cola 600 in Charlotte and took  responsibility for his actions.  On August 25, 2010, LaJoie was reinstated by NASCAR after a two-month suspension.

Motorsports career results

NASCAR
(key) (Bold – Pole position awarded by qualifying time. Italics – Pole position earned by points standings or practice time. * – Most laps led.)

NASCAR Cup Series

Daytona 500

Busch Series

Craftsman Truck Series

ARCA Permatex SuperCar Series
(key) (Bold – Pole position awarded by qualifying time. Italics – Pole position earned by points standings or practice time. * – Most laps led.)

International Race of Champions
(key) (Bold – Pole position. * – Most laps led.)

References

External links
 
 
 Randy LaJoie at NASCAR.com
 The Joie of Seating

Living people
1961 births
Sportspeople from Norwalk, Connecticut
Racing drivers from Connecticut
NASCAR drivers
International Race of Champions drivers
NASCAR Xfinity Series champions
Doping cases in auto racing
American sportspeople in doping cases
Hendrick Motorsports drivers